Disney's Children's Favorite Songs, Volume 3 is a collection of 23 best-loved songs for kids.  The songs are performed by Larry Groce and The Disneyland Children's Sing-Along Chorus. The Choral Director is Betty Joyce.  The CD is produced by Pat Patrick and Ron Kid, and engineered by Kent Madison and George Charouhas. It was released in 1986 by Disneyland Records and in 2006 by Walt Disney Records. This album is the final volume of Disney's Children's Favorites released by Disneyland Records. Distributed by Buena Vista Pictures Distribution, Inc.

Track listing
All songs are public domain except where listed.
 "If You're Happy and You Know It"1:09
 "Shoo, Fly, Don't Bother Me"1:00
 "Oh Dear, What Can the Matter Be?"1:59
 Activity Medley: "Itsy Bitsy Spider", "Ring Around the Rosy", "One, Two, Buckle My Shoe"1:35
 "Hush, Little Baby"1:39
 "Did You Ever See a Lassie?"1:24
 "Grandfather's Clock"3:22
 "Clementine1:49 
 "Michael, Row the Boat Ashore"2:29
 "Alouette"2:02
 "With Apologies to Mother Goose" (Will Ryan)2:15
 "Sweet Betsy from Pike"1:21
 "Over the River and Through the Wood"1:15
 "Billy Boy"1:38
 Nursery Rhyme Medley: "Baa, Baa, Black Sheep", "Sing a Song of Sixpence", "Old King Cole"1:57
 "Alphabet Song"1:26
 "Why Do They Make Things Like They Do? (from the Disneyland/Golden Book Read-Along Just For You)" (Larry Groce)2:04
 "Loch Lomond"2:04
 "A-Hunting We Will Go"0:54 
 "Down in the Valley"2:05
 "Waltzing Matilda" (Banjo Paterson)2:25
 "Just for You (from the Disneyland/Golden Book Read-Along Just For You)" (Larry Groce)2:18
 "Good Night, Ladies"1:05

References 

1986 compilation albums
Disneyland Records compilation albums
Children's music albums